The Peoples Decide (LPD) was a Spanish electoral list in the European Parliament election in 2014 made up from left-wing pro-independence parties. It included Basque Country Gather (EH Bildu) together with Gorripidea, the Galician Nationalist Bloc (BNG), Andecha Astur (AA), Puyalón de Cuchas (Puyalón), Unity of the People (UP) and Canarian Nationalist Alternative (ANC).

The head of the list was Josu Juaristi (EH Bildu) followed by Ana Miranda Paz (BNG). The writer Suso de Toro was also present in the list, within the quota of the BNG. If LPD won a single seat, EH Bildu and the BNG agreed to divide the legislature based on the votes of the list in the Basque Country, Navarre and Galicia.

Composition

Electoral performance

European Parliament

References

Galician Nationalist Bloc
Defunct political party alliances in Spain
Defunct socialist parties in Spain
Left-wing nationalist parties
Defunct nationalist parties in Spain
Defunct left-wing political party alliances